Hymenostylium is a genus of mosses belonging to the family Pottiaceae.

Species:
 Hymenostylium annotinum Mitt. ex Dixon
 Hymenostylium aurantiacum Mitt.
 Hymenostylium barbula (Schwägr.) Mitt.

References

Pottiaceae
Moss genera